Dobrovo is a settlement the Littoral region of Slovenia, close to the border with Italy. It is the administrative centre of the Municipality of Brda. It lies on the road that connects the Friuli Plain and the Soča Valley.

Dobrovo Castle is a castle in the settlement built around 1600 on the foundations of an older structure. It is an almost perfect square in plan with square turrets on each corner. It houses an art gallery and a museum. The castle chapel is dedicated to Saint Anthony of Padua and belongs to the Parish of Biljana.

References

External links
Dobrovo on Geopedia

Populated places in the Municipality of Brda